"Hystereo" is an instrumental composition by Dutch disc jockey and record producer Armin van Buuren. The track was released in the Netherlands by Armind as a digital download on 5 September 2014 as the only single from van Buuren's compilation A State of Trance, Ibiza 2014.

Music video 
A music video to accompany the release of "Hystereo" was first released onto YouTube on 8 October 2014.

Track listing 
 Netherlands Digital download 
 "Hystereo" (Original Mix) – 5:05

 Netherlands Digital download 
 "Hystereo" (Radio Edit) – 2:40
 "Hystereo" (Original Mix) – 5:05

 Netherlands CD Single 
 "Hystereo" (Radio Edit) – 2:40

 Netherlands Digital download - The Remixes 
 "Hystereo" (Heatbeat Remix) – 5:14
 "Hystereo" (KhoMha Remix) – 5:37
 "Hystereo" (Thomas Vink Remix) - 7:03

 France Digital download
 "Hystereo" (Radio Edit) – 2:42
 "Hystereo" (Heatbeat Radio Edit) – 2:45
 "Hystereo" (KhoMha Radio Edit) – 3:00
 "Hystereo" (Thomas Vink Radio Edit) – 3:38
 "Hystereo" (Original Mix) – 5:05
 "Hystereo" (Heatbeat Remix) – 5:15
 "Hystereo" (KhoMha Remix) – 5:38
 "Hystereo" (Thomas Vink Remix) – 7:04
 "Hystereo" (Intro Mix) - 6:56

 Netherlands Digital download Wach Remix 
 "Hystereo" (Wach Remix) – 6:01

 Netherlands Digital download Wach Remix 
 "Hystereo" (Wach Radio Edit) – 2:25
 "Hystereo" (Wach Remix) – 6:01

Charts

References 

2014 singles
Armin van Buuren songs
2014 songs
Songs written by Armin van Buuren
Armada Music singles
Songs written by Benno de Goeij